The 1876–77 Football Association Challenge Cup was the sixth staging of the FA Cup, England's oldest football tournament. Thirty-seven teams entered, five more than the previous season, although five of the thirty-seven never played a match.

Format
First round: 36 teams (Queen's Park getting a bye) would play.

Second round: 18 teams (with Queen's Park still having a bye) would play

Third round: The 10 remaining teams would play a game.

Fourth Round: 4 teams, with Wanderers getting a bye would play for a spot in the semi-finals

Semi-finals: 2 of the 3 remaining teams would play for a chance to play Oxford University (after getting a bye) in the final 

Final: Oxford University would face the semi-final for the chance to win their second FA Cup

First round

Second round

Third round

Replay

Fourth round

Replay

Semi-finals

Final

References
 FA Cup Results Archive 

1876-77
1876–77 in English football
FA Cup